Yoná Magalhães Gonçalves Mendes da Costa (August 7, 1935 – October 20, 2015), known professionally as Yoná Magalhães, was a Brazilian actress.

Selected filmography
 Black God, White Devil (1964)
 A Sombra de Rebecca (1967)
 Uma Rosa com Amor (1972)
 O Grito (1975)
 Gaivotas (1979)
 Cavalo Amarelo (1980)
 Os Imigrantes (1981)
 Amor com Amor Se Paga (1984)
 Roque Santeiro (1985)
 Vida Nova (1988)
 Tieta (1989)
 Meu Bem, Meu Mal (1990)
 Sonho Meu (1993)
 A Próxima Vítima (1995)
 Era Uma Vez (1998)
 Vila Madalena (1999)
 A Padroeira (2001)
 As Filhas da Mãe (2001)
 Um Só Coração (2004)
 Senhora do Destino (2004)
 Paraíso Tropical (2007)
 Cama de Gato (2009)
 Sangue Bom (2013)

References

External links

1935 births
2015 deaths
Actresses from Rio de Janeiro (city)
Brazilian television actresses
Brazilian telenovela actresses
Brazilian film actresses